William Harold Malkin (30 July 1868 – 11 October 1959) was the 21st mayor of Vancouver, British Columbia. He was born in Burslem, Staffordshire, England. He served as chairman of the Vancouver Board of Trade in 1902. 

Malkin succeeded L. D. Taylor as mayor in 1929, and served through 1930. After Malkin's re-election campaign failed, Taylor was re-elected as mayor in 1931. 

While in power, Malkin presided over a newly expanded Greater Vancouver which formed by merging the existing city of Vancouver with the municipalities of Point Grey and South Vancouver. Malkin was responsible for the construction of the Malkin Bowl in Stanley Park, and named it for his wife, Marion.

References

External links
Vancouver History: list of mayors, accessed 20 August 2006

1868 births
1959 deaths
Mayors of Vancouver
People from Burslem
Burials at Mountain View Cemetery (Vancouver)
20th-century Canadian politicians